Teletrece —also known as T13 or Tele 13— is the flagship daily evening television news programme of the Chilean television channel Canal 13. It is presented by journalists Ramón Ulloa and Mónica Pérez. First aired on 1 March 1970 it is currently the longest-running television programme and the second most watched national newscast in Chile.

It is broadcast Monday to Sunday at 9:00pm in continental territory and 7:00pm in Easter Island. It features ninety minutes of national, international and sports news, followed by a national weather forecast with Carolina Infante. The 9pm primetime edition is broadcast primarily live from the Channel 13 Television Centre in Providencia, Santiago Metropolitan Region to viewers all over Chile.

History 
Teletrece was launched on 1 March 1970, replacing the former newscast El repórter Esso (1964-1968) and Martini al instante (1968-1970) and thus is the current flagship programme from the news division of the network, which started in 1963. Pepe Abad, Pepe Guixé and Freddy Hube were the program's first newsreaders. Since its initial duration of 30 minutes each night, Teletrece begins to extend to reach during 1973, with its broadcast hour now being an hour and a half, with three daily editions of 30 minutes, because of the large amount of information which were produced within the day. These editions would form the basis of the Teletrece brand of newscasts, in addition to 5-minute news updates during the day and the Sunday afternoon newscast Perfil Noticioso de la Semana, presented by Javier Miranda. By 1971, its initial anti-Allende stance, a project of criticism in its early days, gave way to a balanced view of the news, which gave it an edge compared to the other newscasts in other channels.

After the coup that overthrew Salvador Allende, Canal 13 through Teletrece had a fundamental role, broadcasting news during those moments, becoming then the second newscast to be broadcast nationwide, as TVN was then shut down. In 1974, Abad was replaced as principal presenter by Guillermo Parada, who stayed on for only a year.

In 1975, César Antonio Santis arrived to a relaunched Nuevo Teletrece as the new presenter on his return to Canal 13. In 1977 the newscast adopted chroma key for its production.

On 1 January 1978, Teletrece made the first national colour news broadcast, this after the Pinochet government decree exempted the color television as prohibited goods status it had since January 1972 under a strengthening of protectionist policies during the period 1970 to 1973. In 1977, Javier Miranda joined Teletrece as alternate principal presenter for weekends, leading up to its credibility strengthened against competitors in that timeslot, including the national newscast 60 minutos (TVN), criticized by opponents of Augusto Pinochet to be partial and lacking in credibility. The Miranda-Santis tandem would prove to be pivotal as the newscast soon became the nation's most watched and most trusted. Each of the two presenters, joined by a variety of segment panel presenters within their respective airings, gave the newscast the feel and look of a more advanced news program. In 1983 Santis ended the May 14 newscast with a tribute to the legendary Lira Street news studios of Channel 13, then located in the downtown Santiago campus of the Catholic University which it shared for many years, in a stunning farewell, as the editions to be aired from the following day onwards would be produced and aired live from the brand new news studios at the Channel 13 Television Centre. In 1985 it was the first newscast reporting on the consequences of 1985 earthquake on the south coasts of Valparaíso Region, which left 177 dead. Teletrece then continued until about 1 AM broadcasting what would be one of its marathon editions in its history.

In 1988, Santis left to join the TVN news department, leaving Miranda as the presenter for weekdays. Augusto Gatica then assumed the presenter role for weekends until 1990, when he was replaced by Jorge Díaz. Since Miranda, too, was the presenter of the Tuesday night variety programme Martes 13 until he left the series following the 1992 season, Gatica also became relief presenter for the Tuesday edition until 1989, when Diaz took over. In 1990, Teletrece became a single-presenter program, which moved to the Channel 13 Press Center studios. In 1998 the morning edition was launched, which in 1999 restarted broadcasts under the brand Teletrece AM.

On Sunday 26 September 1999, Rodrigo Jordan, Canal 13 director-in-chief, relaunched the telecast with new presenters Jorge Diaz, and Carolina Jimenez for weekdays, and weekends by Silvia Carrasco and Rodolfo Paredes. Regular members of the panel included Ramon Ulloa, Antonio Quinteros and  Matilde Burgos. All Teletrece editions, studios and graphics were refreshed to be more cohesive with the new branding. When Diaz left the program in 2002, Jimenez made history as the first woman solo presenter for the newscast.

From 30 April 2002 to 20 February 2009, Teletrece was hosted only by Mauricio Hofmann and along with Constanza Santa Maria from 2005 to 2007. Since 9 November 2005, this newsletter is the first Chilean program (discarding 2005 Presidential Debates and speeches of 11–12 March and 21 May) to incorporate the system closed caption (CC), in addition to the program does Teletarde. In mid-2007, Teletrece began to be produced in high definition. In 2009 Canal 13 began to centralize the newscast's reporter pool and content, closing Teletrece's news centres in Antofagasta and Temuco. The channel, later on 29 August 2014, briefly closed the news centre in Concepción, leaving only the news centre of Valparaiso, but the decision was rescinded. Both regional editions ended broadcasts in 2018 and 2019, respectively, and today these reporters form the regional bureaux that provide reports that are transmitted nationally from its studios at the Santiago-based Channel 13 Television Centre. In 2020 live opt-outs from the regions debuted during the national broadcast to serve regional viewers, adopting the format previously used by the Nine News regional editions in stations under Southern Cross Nine (now 10 Regional) in Australia.

On 2 May 2012, the programme, along with the rest of Teletrece editions, underwent a graphical refresh and new presenters Montserrat Alvarez and Ramon Ulloa with a new studio, but two years later on 11 August 2014, Monserrat Alvarez left T13, and her place was taken by Constanza Santa Maria. Since 22 October 2014, the bulletin has been simulcast on the 13c channel. On 16 March 2016, Teletrece debuted a new graphics package and minor updates to the set.

Afternoon and late night editions 
These editions, Teletrece Tarde and Teletrece Noche, began in 1970, the same year as Teletrece, whose 9pm edition is considered the main primetime edition (edicion central), together with the 11:30pm Telecierre, these ended in 1973-1974 (with the departure of some of its presenters) and would return in 1981, remaining on air until the present. At first, the afternoon edition, then branded Teletarde, was presented by Mirella Latorre (later replaced by Gina Zuanic) and Julio Pérez, the then early evening Telenoche with Miranda, Rose Marie Graepp (later replaced by  Virginia Escobedo) and Pepe Guixé, and Telecierre by Freddy Hube, who was co-presenter with Guixé and Abad in the main newscast. Telenoche was replaced in 1974 with the newscast 24 Horas (not to be confused with the same-named newscast on TVN), which was short-lived, it was presented by Julio López Blanco, who left for TVN in 1975. Both Teletarde and Telenoche returned to broadcasts in 1981 with 20-minute broadcasts and their new presenters Cecilia Serrano and Jorge Diaz, with the latter now taking over Telecierre'''s old timeslot. Serrano left the afternoon newscast for TVN in 1990, with the then Teletrece weather presenter Jeannette Frazier replacing her while Diaz was, upon his promotion as presenter for weekends, replaced by Loreto Delpín. Both by then were broadcasting from the Channel 13 Newsroom, first located at the Central Campus and then at the Television Centre, and by 1990 moved on to share a singular studio with the main edition and with half-hour durations each.

 Presenters 
 Current presenters 
Weekdays
 Ramón Ulloa (2011-).
 Mónica Pérez (2020-)
Weekends and special editions
 Iván Valenzuela (2009-2012; 2014-).
 Carolina Urrejola (2010-).
 Paulo Ramírez (2010-).
 Cristina González (2013-).
 Álvaro Paci (2013-).
 Alfonso Concha (2014-).

 Former presenters 
 Pepe Abad (1970-1972).
 Guillermo Parada (1972-1975).
 Julio López Blanco (1975).
 Alfonso Pérez (1975).
 Francisco Hernández (1975).
 César Antonio Santis (1975-1988).
 Javier Miranda (1976-1987; 1988-1999).
 Augusto Gatica (1988-1990; 1988-1989).
 Jorge Díaz Saenger (1990-1992; 1995-2002).
 Eduardo Riveros (1995-1999; 2001-2009).
 Carolina Jiménez (1999-2002).	
 Silvia Carrasco (1999-2001).
 Rodolfo Paredes (1999-2000).
 Mauricio Hofmann (2001-2009; 2013-2014).
 Soledad Onetto (2009-2011).
 Monserrat Álvarez (2011-2014).
 Macarena Puigrredón (2009-2010).
 Marlén Eguiguren (2013-2014).
 Antonio Quinteros (2002-2017).
 Constanza Santa Maria (2005-2007; 2010-2012; 2014–2021).

 Weather forecast 
 Gabriela Velasco (1975-1978).
 Gina Zuanic (1977-1992).
 Carmen Jaureguiberry (1977-1990).
 Jeanette Frazier (1985-1991).
 Bárbara Ackermann (1993-2002).
 Loreto Delpín (1991-2010).
 Vanesa Borghi (2009-2010).
 Carolina Infante (1997-1998, 2001-)
 Michelle Adam (2001-2004, 2013-)

 Segment presenters 
During the 1980s the newscast's presenter either on weekends or weekdays was joined by the following segment reporters:

 Sports: Julio Martínez, Raúl Prado Cavada and Alberto Fouillioux
 International news: José María Navasal, Alejandro Magnet, Juan Ramón Silva, Bernardo de la Maza, Karin Ebensperger, Julio Prado Donoso, Sonia Jankelevich
 Religious news and commentary: Raúl Hasbún and Luis Eugenio Silva
 Business and finance: Manuel Salgado Inzunza
 Entertainment and special interests: Marina de Navasal, María Inés Sáez

 Logos 

 See also 
 24 Horas.
 Chilevisión Noticias.
 Ahora Noticias''.

References

External links 
  
 Teletrece on Twitter 
 Teletrece on Facebook 

1970 Chilean television series debuts
Chilean television news shows
Canal 13 (Chilean TV channel) original programming
1970s Chilean television series
1980s Chilean television series
1990s Chilean television series
2000s Chilean television series
2010s Chilean television series
2020s Chilean television series
Flagship evening news shows
Spanish-language television shows